Bernard von Prambach, also known as Wernhard (around 1220 – 27 July 1313) was the 42nd Bishop of Passau from 1285 to 1313.

Life
He also invited several diocesan controversies  among them 1293 (according to which the clergy had to wear simple costumes), in March 1294 in St. Pölten (the plundering and firefights were debated), and again in Passau (1302) on whether St. Gotthard was compulsory for the whole bishopric.

From the year 1293 Bernhard paid special attention to the Cistercian order. In Engelhartszell, on the estate inherited from his parents, he founded a new Cistercian penitentiary: the Engelszell monastery.

In May 1298 the Passau citizenship rose to an insurrection, the object of which was to press for Passau to a Reichsstadt, with which the bishop would have lost his position as a Stadtherr. At the end of November, at the Reichstag in Münster, the arbitration by King Albert I took place, which caused the insurrection to fail and thus put an end to the aspirations of the Passau citizens to independence. The citizens accepted the conditions of peace - among other things, even the town hall fell into the possession of the bishop - and Bernhard was once again the unqualified master of the city. Nevertheless, on 15 August 1299 he issued the so-called "Bernhardin Stadtbrief" ("Bernhardin Stadtbrief") and thus a new binding city law, which was very advanced and extended compared to the former city letter. This new legal system lasted more than 500 years, until 1806.

On 27 July 1313, Bishop Bernhard died.

The conversion of the Romanesque cathedral, which was damaged by the city fire of 1181, is now largely Gothic.

References

1313 deaths
13th-century Roman Catholic bishops in Bavaria
Roman Catholic bishops of Passau
14th-century Roman Catholic bishops in Bavaria
Year of birth uncertain